''Sections of this article are translated from the Scottish page .

The Mazda Navajo is a mid-size SUV manufactured by Ford Motor Company for the Japanese automaker Mazda, and is a rebadged version of the first generation Ford Explorer. It was Mazda's first SUV, and was offered with a choice of rear-wheel drive or four-wheel drive.

The Navajo won the 1991 Motor Trend Truck of the Year award, but the car's Explorer origins meant that it was also part of the Firestone and Ford tire controversy.

Differences 

The Navajo featured a few minor changes from the Explorer it was based on. It got a revised front fascia, new taillamps and wheels, and the bumpers were painted dark gray (resulting in the deletion of all chrome trim). The interior was largely shared between the two model lines, with the Navajo receiving its own lettering for the instrument panel (in line with other Mazda vehicles), and Mazda lettering was added to the Ford steering wheel hub.

Trims 
In place of the three trims offered on the three-door Ford Explorer, Mazda offered the Navajo in base DX and top-tier LX trim (roughly the equivalent of the Explorer Sport and three-door Explorer XLT). Offered only with four-wheel drive at its launch, a rear-wheel drive version of the Navajo was introduced for 1992. As with the first-generation Explorer, all Navajos were fitted with a 4.0 L V6; a five-speed manual was standard, with a four-speed automatic offered as an option (on both the DX and LX).

Discontinuation 
The Mazda Navajo stopped production after three years. It was replaced by the Ford Escape-based Mazda Tribute.

References 

Mazda vehicles
Cars introduced in 1991
Cars discontinued in 1994
All-wheel-drive vehicles